Pennington is a surname indicating a family origin in Pennington, Cumbria. Other branches include members from an area of Surrey, London, Yorkshire, Hampshire and North America.  This surname was originally spelled Penington; some members of the family changed the spelling in the 14th century.

Sport

 Alan Pennington (1916–1961), British sprinter
 Alfred Pennington (born 1975), English footballer
 Art Pennington (1923–2017), David "Superman" Pennington, baseball player
 Chad Pennington (born 1976), James Chadwick Pennington, US footballer
 Cliff Pennington (baseball) (born 1984), Major League Baseball infielder
 Cliff Pennington (ice hockey) (1940–2020), Canadian ice hockey forward
 Elliot Pennington (born 1987), US skater
 George Pennington (cricketer) (active 1927), English sportsman
 Hal Pennington (active 1934–1988), US athletics coach
 Harry Pennington (wrestler) (1902–1995), British wrestler
 Harry Pennington (cricketer) (1880–1961), English cricketer
 Harry Pennington (footballer) (born 1875), English footballer
 Jack Pennington (born 1953), US racing car driver
 Jesse Pennington (1883–1970), English footballer
 Jimmy Pennington (born 1939), English footballer
 Joan Pennington (born 1960), US swimmer
 John Pennington (cricketer) (1881–1942), English cricketer
 Kewpie Pennington (1896–1953), George Louis "Kewpie" Pennington, US baseball player
 Matthew Pennington (born 1994), English footballer
 Parker Pennington (born 1984), Parker Blair Pennington, US figure skater
 Raquel Pennington (born 1988), a US martial artist
 Rowland Pennington (1870–1929), English footballer
 Terrance Pennington (born 1983), US footballer
 Tom Pennington (1939–2013), US footballer

Politics

 A. A. Pennington (1825–1885), US politician
 Alexander C.M. Pennington (1810–1867), US politician
 Andrew Pennington (1960/61–2000), British politician
 Dennis Pennington (1776–1854), US politician
 Fannie Pennington (1914–2013), US activist
 Frederick Pennington (1819–1914), English merchant and politician
 James W.C. Pennington (1809–1870), African-American religious leader and activist
 John Kenneth Pennington (1927–2011), Priest and politician
 John L. Pennington (1829–1900), fifth governor of Dakota Territory
 John Pennington (politician) (1870–1945), Warburton Pennington, Australian politician
 John Pennington, 1st Baron Muncaster (1740–1813), British peer
 William George Pennington (fl. 1858–1868), Australian politician
 William Pennington (1796–1862), US politician
 William Sanford Pennington (1757–1826), US politician

Science, engineering, medicine, etc

 Barry Pennington (1923–1968), William Barry Pennington, British mathematician
 Donald Pennington, British psychologist and Vice-chancellor
 E. J. Pennington (1858–1911), US inventor and entrepreneur
 Havoc Pennington (born c1976), Robert Sanford Havoc Pennington, US computer engineer
 Hugh Pennington (born 1938), Thomas Hugh Pennington, British bacteriologist and academic
 Isaac Pennington (1745–1817), English physician
 Josias Pennington, Architect of Baldwin & Pennington
 Mark Pennington, British political scientist
 Mary Engle Pennington (1872–1952), Engle Pennington, US scientist
 Winifred Pennington (1915–2007), British biologist (aka Winifred Anne Tutin)

Arts and entertainment

 Ann Pennington (actress), 1893–1971
 Ann Pennington (model), b 1950
 Barbara Pennington (born 1950s), US singer
 Basil Pennington (1931–2005), US Catholic priest, religious leader and author
 Brad Pennington (born 1969), US baseball player
 Bruce Pennington (born 1944), British painter and illustrator
 C. M. Pennington-Richards (1911–2005), Cyril Montague Pennington Richards, British film director
 Elliot Pennington (born 1987), US ice dancer
 J.P. Pennington (born 1949), US musician Exile
 James Pennington (born 1965), US musician AKA Suburban Knight
 Janice Pennington (born 1942), US model
 Joe Pennington (1928–2020), US guitarist aka "Joe Penny,"
 Jon Penington (1922–1997), British screenwriter
 Marla Pennington (born 1954), US actress
 Melanne Pennington (1960–1988), US singer and dancer
 Michael Pennington (born 1943), Michael Vivian Fyfe Pennington, British actor and director
 Michael Joseph Pennington (born 1970), English actor aka Johnny Vegas 
 Pennington's Seventeenth Summer, aka Pennington's Last Term, a novel by K. M. Peyton
 Ray Pennington, (1933–2020), Ramon Daniel "Ray" Pennington, a US singer
 Ty Pennington (born 1964), Tygert Burton "Ty" Pennington, US TV host
 Zac Pennington ( 2002–2013), US musician of the Parenthetical Girls
 Jim Pennington (born 1972), US Artist
 William Henry Pennington (1833–1923), English soldier and actor

Miscellaneous

 Alexander Cummings McWhorter Pennington Jr. (1838–1917), US soldier
 Basil Pennington (1931–2005), Dom M. Basil Pennington, monk
 Bill Pennington (1956), William Mark Pennington, US journalist
 Brooks Pennington Jr. (1925–1996), US businessman
 Dennis Pennington (1776–1854), farmer and a stonemason
 Irene Wells Pennington (1898–2003), US entrepreneur
 John Penington (1584–1646), Sir John Pennington, English sailor
 Sir Joseph Pennington, 2nd Baronet (1677–1744)
 Josslyn Francis Pennington, 5th Baron Muncaster (1834–1917)
 Julie Pennington-Russell (born 1960), US Baptist minister
 Larcena Pennington Page (1837–1913), US pioneer 
 Lowther Pennington, 2nd Baron Muncaster (1745–1818)
 Richard Pennington (1947–2017), US police officer
 Robert B. Pennington, US Marine charged in 2006 with crimes relating to the abduction and murder of an Iraqi civilian
 Sarah, Lady Pennington (d 1783), an English noblewoman and author
 William Pennington (businessman) (1923–2011), US gambler
 Sir William Pennington, 1st Baronet (1655–1730)

See also
Penington (surname)
Pennington (disambiguation)

References

English-language surnames
English toponymic surnames
Lists of people by surname